Closer and Closer Apart is a 1989 Australian film set in the Italian community of Melbourne. The story concerns a quarter of working-class people in their twenties.

References

External links
 Closer and Closer Apart at IMDb
 Closer and Closer Apart at Angelo Salamanca's personal website

Australian drama films
1980s English-language films
1989 films
1989 drama films
1980s Australian films